The Nahal Mishmar hoard is the hoard of archaeological artifacts found by a 1961 expedition led by Pessah Bar-Adon in a cave by Nahal Mishmar  in the Judaean Desert near the Dead Sea, Israel. The collection wrapped  in a straw mat found under debris in a natural crevice contained 442 objects: 429 of copper, six of hematite, one of stone, five of hippopotamus ivory, and one of elephant ivory. Carbon-14 dating of the mat suggests the date at least 3,500 BCE, i.e., it places the hoard into the Chalcolithic period.

Origin of the hoard
The objects of the hoard seem to be collected in a hurry. There are several theories about the origin of the hoard. Yosef Garfinkel  stated that no proof have been provided for the connection of the hoard with the temple and suggested that this was a burial of cult objects, to prevent their desecration, drawing a parallel with the find in the Nahal Hemar Cave Miriam Tadmor suggests that it was a kind of merchants' warehouse, judging from the amount of mundane objects, as well as tools and raw materials. It was also suggested that a possible alternate source of the hoard could have been another cultic location, at the place of some fragmentary ruins near the cave.

References

Chalcolithic sites of Asia
Archaeological sites in Israel
Caves of Israel
Judaean Desert